Daniel Altavilla (born September 8, 1992) is an American professional baseball pitcher in the Boston Red Sox organization. He played in Major League Baseball for the Seattle Mariners from 2016 through 2020, and the San Diego Padres from 2020 through 2021.

Amateur career

Altavilla attended Elizabeth Forward High School in Elizabeth, Pennsylvania and played college baseball at Mercyhurst University. After his sophomore season in 2013, he played collegiate summer baseball for the Yarmouth–Dennis Red Sox of the Cape Cod Baseball League. As a junior at Mercyhurst, he was 9–1 with a 1.23 ERA in 12 starts, striking out a school-record 129 batters in 80.1 innings. He was drafted by the Seattle Mariners in the fifth round of the 2014 Major League Baseball Draft and signed for $250,000.

Professional career

Seattle Mariners
After signing, Altavilla made his professional debut that same year with the Everett AquaSox and spent the whole season there, going 5–3 with a 4.36 ERA in 14 starts. In 2015, he played for the Bakersfield Blaze where he pitched to a 6–12 record with a 4.07 ERA and 1.29 WHIP in 28 games started. He began 2016 with the Jackson Generals.

Altavilla was called up to the majors for the first time on August 27, 2016, and he made his major league debut that same night. In 43 relief appearances for Jackson prior to being recalled, he was 7–3 with 1.91 ERA. He spent the remainder of the season with Seattle, compiling a 0.73 ERA in 12.1 innings pitched.

Altavilla began 2017 with Seattle, but was sent down to the Tacoma Rainers in April. He was recalled from Tacoma multiple times during the season before being recalled for the remainder of the season for September call-ups. In twenty games for Tacoma he was 2–0 with a 1.54 ERA, and in 41 games for Seattle, he was 1–1 with a 4.24 ERA. Altavilla began 2018 with Seattle but was placed on the disabled list in late April with joint inflammation. After being activated on May 12, he returned to Seattle, but was sent back down to Tacoma on May 23. He was recalled once again on May 27. He was limited to just 22 appearances in 2018 and 17 in 2019 due to injury and inconsistency.

On July 29, 2020, Altavilla recorded his first career save in a 10–7 win over the Los Angeles Angels.

San Diego Padres
On August 30, 2020, the Mariners traded Altavilla, Austin Nola, and Austin Adams to the San Diego Padres for Ty France, Taylor Trammell, Andrés Muñoz, and Luis Torrens. In 9 appearances for San Diego, he was 1–1 with a 3.12 ERA.

On April 17, 2021, Altavilla was placed on the 10-day injured list with right elbow inflammation. Through 2 games, Altavilla recorded a 6.75 ERA. He was later transferred to the 60-day injured list on May 28. On June 29, Altavilla underwent Tommy John surgery, ending his 2021 season. On November 3, the Padres outrighted him to Triple-A. That same day, Altavilla elected free agency.

Boston Red Sox
In mid-March 2022, Altavilla was reported to have agreed to a two-year minor-league deal with the Boston Red Sox; the signing was confirmed by the team on March 30.

References

External links

Mercyhurst Lakers bio

1992 births
Living people
People from Elizabeth, Pennsylvania
Baseball players from Pennsylvania
Major League Baseball pitchers
Seattle Mariners players
San Diego Padres players
Mercyhurst Lakers baseball players
Yarmouth–Dennis Red Sox players
Everett AquaSox players
Bakersfield Blaze players
Jackson Generals (Southern League) players
Tacoma Rainiers players
Arkansas Travelers players
Sportspeople from the Pittsburgh metropolitan area